Frown is a Slovakian gothic rock band. It was formed in Prešov, Slovakia, in 1997 and has released four studio albums.

Background
Slovakian vocalist Marian Drac formed the band Frown in 1997 then recruited the original guitarist Jan Kolesar, bassist Ján "Kafi" Kavulič, and keyboardist Zuzana Bérešová. Months after they formed, they released their first demo, Falsehood, then a year later they released their second demo, Gift of Suffering. Martin "Chemik" Porubsky replaced Zuzana on keyboards. Frown released their first studio album, Features and Causes of the Frozen Origin, in 2001, and their second, Lunar Brightshine and Fiery Splendour, on Halloween in 2003. These two albums are noted for having strong Type O Negative influences in them with Marián's vocals resembling Peter Steele's of the said band. The notable songs are "Dawning (For a Sweet Girl)", "Breath for Dead", and "Dreadful Moon" on the first album, and "Last Summer Days", "Salvation", and "Rusty Flame" on the second album. Their third album, Lovesinspain, was released in 2005. The album have a different musical style while still retaining gothic influences of the first two. The sound of the album more resembles The Sisters of Mercy, HIM, and The 69 Eyes, such as showcased in the tracks "Redemption", "Not from Christian Love", and "Crucify Me".

Frown went on a nine-year hiatus between studio records. During that time, bassist Ján "Kafi" Kavulič exited the band and Dráč began to play bass in addition to vocals as a memorandum for Peter Steele, who died at 48 in April 2010. In 2014, their fourth album, Introspection of Memoirs, was released, showcasing some return of the musical elements of their first two studio records. 2015 saw two replacements in their lineup. Zeleznik and Kolesar exited the band and were replaced by Peter Kertvel on drums and Lubomir Dzvonik on guitars. Dzvonik would leave the band a year later, and it still remains without a guitarist.

Members
Current lineup
 Marián Dráč – vocals (1997–present), bass (2010–present)
 Martin "Chemik" Porubsky – keyboards
 Peter Kertvel – drums (2015–present)

Past lineup
 Frantisek Zeleznik – drums (?–2015)
 Jan Kolesar – guitars (?–2015)
 Zuzana Bérešová – keyboards
 Ján "Kafi" Kavulič – bass (1997–2010)
 Lubomir Dzvonik – guitars (2015–2016)

Discography

Studio albums
 Features and Causes of the Frozen Origin (2001)
 Lunar Brightshine and Fiery Splendour (2003) 
 Lovesinspain (2005)
 Introspection of Memoirs (2014)

Demos
 Falsehood (1997)
 Gift of Suffering (1998)

External links
 
 Frown - Encyclopaedia Metallum

Musical groups established in 1997
1997 establishments in Slovakia
Gothic metal musical groups
Doom metal musical groups
Slovak heavy metal musical groups